The Michigan Department of Education (MDE) is a state agency of Michigan, in the United States. The MDE oversees public school districts in the state. The department is governed by the State Board of Education. The State Board of Education was first provided for in the Constitution of 1850 and currently exists through the provisions of Article VIII, Section 3, of the Constitution of 1963. The state board is composed of eight members  nominated by party conventions and elected at-large for terms of eight years, with two members being elected at each biennial state general election. The governor is authorized to fill vacancies on the state board and also serves as an ex officio member of the state board, without the right to vote. The Superintendent of Public Instruction is appointed by the board for a term to be determined by the board, to serve as its chair, without the right to vote.

The department is led by the Superintendent of Public Instruction Michael F. Rice who was appointed in 2019. As the principal executive officer of the Department of Education, the Superintendent sits on the Governor's Cabinet, the State Administrative Board, and acts as chair and a non-voting member of the State Board of Education.  The Superintendent advises the Legislature on education policy and funding needs, as defined by the State Board of Education. The Superintendent is responsible for the implementation of bills passed by the Legislature and policies established by the State Board of Education. The Superintendent is a spokesperson for education in the state. The Superintendent also is the primary liaison to the United States Department of Education and other federal agencies.

Major departmental responsibilities include: educator preparation and certification; providing technical assistance to schools in the areas of education improvement and innovation, special education, grants, transportation, health and food programs; statewide student assessment; school accountability; career and technical education; early childhood learning; distribution of state school aid; and overseeing the distribution and use of federal education program funding. The department also operates the Library of Michigan and the Michigan School for the Deaf in Flint.

List of superintendents of public instruction

The following is a list of those who have served as Michigan Superintendent of Public Instruction.

References

External links
 Michigan Department of Education

Department of Education
Education
State departments of education of the United States
1850 establishments in Michigan